The Big Swindle is a 2004 South Korean heist film written and directed by Choi Dong-hoon. It was Choi's feature film directorial debut. It follows a group of four con men, one con woman, and one forger in a complex set of plots and counterplots against individual marks, against the Bank of Korea, against the police, and against each other.

Plot
Choi Chang-hyeok is driving in his car, when he suddenly finds himself followed by the cops. In the following chase he tries to escape, but as his car emerges from a tunnel it goes over the side, down a cliff and is killed in the burning wreck. The reason he tried to escape, is that he had just left the Bank of Korea, where he was part of a scam, that got him and his four accomplices the neat sum of 5 billion won. One of his accomplices was caught, and the other three disappeared – and so did all the money. 

Eol-mae was the one caught by the cops, and they try to get him to talk and reveal the scam and his accomplices. In flashbacks we see how the plan was hatched, and get to know the suspects. The cops tries to find out more about the killed Chang-hyeok, and find his brother, who is the owner of a used book store. He has been at odds with his deceased brother, but now gets a big life insurance. This interests Seo In-kyeong. She has been living with Mr. Kim, who is a veteran con artist and the mastermind in the scam. In-kyeong learns about Chang-hyeok and now wants to get to know about his brother.

Awards and nominations
2004 Busan Film Critics Awards
 Best Supporting Actor – Baek Yoon-sik
 Best New Director – Choi Dong-hoon

2004 Grand Bell Awards
 Best Original Screenplay – Choi Dong-hoon
 Best New Director – Choi Dong-hoon
 Nomination – Best Actor – Park Shin-yang
 Nomination – Best Supporting Actor – Chun Ho-jin
 Nomination – Best Supporting Actor – Lee Moon-sik
 Nomination – Best Editing – Shin Min-kyung

2004 Blue Dragon Film Awards
 Best Supporting Actress – Yum Jung-ah
 Best Screenplay – Choi Dong-hoon
 Best New Director – Choi Dong-hoon
 Nomination – Best Film
 Nomination – Best Actor – Park Shin-yang
 Nomination – Best Supporting Actor – Baek Yoon-sik
 Nomination – Best Cinematography – Choi Young-hwan
 Nomination – Best Art Direction – Lee Min-bok
 Nomination – Best Visual Effects – Kim Tae-hun

2004 Korean Film Awards
 Best Supporting Actor – Baek Yoon-sik
 Best Screenplay – Choi Dong-hoon
 Best New Director – Choi Dong-hoon
 Best Editing – Shin Min-kyung
 Nomination – Best Actor – Park Shin-yang
 Nomination – Best Art Direction – Lee Min-bok

2004 Director's Cut Awards
 Best New Director – Choi Dong-hoon

References

External links 
 
 
 
 The Big Swindle review at Koreanfilm.org

2004 films
2004 crime thriller films
South Korean crime thriller films
South Korean heist films
Films directed by Choi Dong-hoon
Showbox films
2000s Korean-language films
2004 directorial debut films
2000s South Korean films